Jesús Ramírez Stabros (born 22 April 1963) is a Mexican politician from the Institutional Revolutionary Party. He has served as deputy of the LVIII and LX Legislatures of the Mexican Congress representing San Luis Potosí.

References

1963 births
Living people
Politicians from San Luis Potosí
Institutional Revolutionary Party politicians
Mexican people of Greek descent
21st-century Mexican politicians
Deputies of the LX Legislature of Mexico
Members of the Chamber of Deputies (Mexico) for San Luis Potosí